The following is the complete list of songs that have been featured in ParaParaParadise, a dancing music video game developed by Konami.

Included in each table is the title, artist, and recordings. This list is sorted by the versions the songs debuted on.

ParaParaParadise 2ndMIX

ParaParaParadise1stMIXPlus

ParaParaDancing 
Korean release of ParaParaParadise. Compared of original release, I Wanna Dance and Tora Tora Tora were removed because of the censorship of Japanese lyrics in Korea, and Hold on me was replaced to Korean lyrics version. All new songs exclusive in this version are the songs from SM Entertainment with remixed to eurobeat style, only appearing in Freestyle mode.

ParaParaParadise

See also 
 List of Eurobeat artists

External links 
 ParaParaParadise Official Web 
 Avex Japan Eurobeat - Super Eurobeat Official Web. 

 
Lists of songs in music video games